Chamaegeron is a genus of flowering plants in the family Asteraceae.

 Species
 Chamaegeron asterellus (Bornm.) Botsch. - Iran
 Chamaegeron bungei (Boiss.) Botsch. -Kazakhstan, Uzbekistan, Turkmenistan, Afghanistan, Iran
 Chamaegeron keredjensis (Bornm. & Gauba) Grierson - Iran
 Chamaegeron oligocephalus Schrenk - Pakistan, Kazakhstan, Uzbekistan, Turkmenistan, Afghanistan, Iran

References

Asteraceae genera
Astereae
Taxa named by Alexander von Schrenk